GBU Indoor Stadium or Gautam Buddha University Indoor Stadium is an indoor stadium located in the campus of Gautam Buddha University area of Greater Noida in Uttar Pradesh, India. GBU Indoor Stadium is one wing of Eklavya Sports Complex which consists of a separate cricket stadium, hockey stadium, football stadium, track and field ground, basketball and volleyball courts, and other sports facilities. The stadium was built in 2015 with a cost of ₹78 crore (780,000,000) for the purpose of promoting indoor sport in the city. The stadium has international standards as a table tennis court, an outdoor basketball court, a badminton court as well as TT complex.

The stadium was used by Pro Wrestling League. The stadium is also non-sports activities like exhibitions, seminars, and cultural activities.

References

External links 
 
 Pro Wrestling League

Sports venues in Noida
Indoor arenas in India
Sports venues completed in 2015
2015 establishments in Uttar Pradesh